Windtower is a  tower-like summit located in the Wind Valley of Kananaskis Country in the Canadian Rockies of Alberta, Canada. Its nearest higher peak is Mount Lougheed,  to the southeast. Windtower is a conspicuous landmark that can be seen from Highway 1, the Trans-Canada Highway in the Canmore area. Although not of remarkable elevation, the mountain has an imposing, overhanging north face with an appearance similar to peaks in The Bugaboos.


Climbing Routes

The Iron Butterfly is a formidable 450 metre 5.11 A4 rock climbing route on the northwest face. It was first climbed in 1988 by Jeff Marshall and Steve DeMaio, but attempts by others to repeat the feat have been unsuccessful.

The Northeast Ridge is a 5.5 route first climbed by B. Corbeau, G. Crocker and K. Hahn in July 1965.

The Northeast Face is a 570-metre 5.10a route first climbed by G. Homer and R. Wood in 1972.

The West Slope is a hike and easy scree scramble from Highway 742, the Smith-Dorrien/Spray Trail.

History

Windtower was named in 1950. The mountain's name was officially adopted in 1982 by the Geographical Names Board of Canada.

Geology

Windtower is composed of Palliser  limestone, a sedimentary rock laid down during the Precambrian to Jurassic periods. Formed in shallow seas, this sedimentary rock was pushed east and over the top of younger rock during the Laramide orogeny.

Climate

Based on the Köppen climate classification, Windtower is located in a subarctic climate zone with cold, snowy winters, and mild summers.

See also
List of mountains of Canada
Geology of Alberta

References

External links
 Windtower weather web site: Mountain Forecast

Two-thousanders of Alberta
Canadian Rockies
Alberta's Rockies